Lower Salem is a village in Washington County, Ohio, United States. The population was 86 at the 2010 census. The village is home to a number of local businesses as well as a bank attached to the post office and a volunteer fire department next to the Salem Township Cemetery. Salem-Liberty Elementary School sits north of State Route 821 opposite the East Fork of Duck Creek west of the town's corporation limit and serves as the elementary school for more than 100 students of the Fort Frye Local School District. The municipal building, adjacent to the Bob Hausser Community Park, served as an outpost of the Washington County Sheriff's Office during the early 2000s. A number of unincorporated villages share Lower Salem's post office. These include Warner, Dalzell, Bonn, Harriettsville, and Germantown. The area is home to a number of churches. The only one within city limits, however, is the Lower Salem United Methodist Church. Until a deal was struck with the town council in 2015, meetings of the Salem-Liberty Homemakers/Lower Salem Boys 4-H Club were held in the church's basement. This group is the result of the consolidation of a club made up predominantly of members of Salem-Liberty's FHA (FCCLA) Organization when it served as a high school and the Lower Salem Boys Club which was established in 1920 and is the oldest operational 4-H club in the state of Ohio. Lower Salem was once home to a hotel, a doctor's office, an armory, Wagner's General Store, and a gas station and auto parts shop. While all of these buildings remain standing, all have gone out of business. The general store has been home to a number of startup businesses, but none have survived much longer than a year.

History
Lower Salem had its start when a corduroy road (called the Old Plank Road) was built through it to Marietta. It has a post office. The town site was not laid out until 1850, and was settled predominantly by German immigrants.

Geography
Lower Salem is located at  (39.562423, -81.394934).

Demographics

Discrepancies Between Census Findings and Local Demographics
The U.S. Census Bureau provides only data pertaining to the population living within the town's 40-acre corporation limit. This information is not representative of the entirety of the population living within the 45745 ZIP Code. An estimate by UnitedStatesZipCodes.org places the total residency at 1140 individuals in the ZIP Code's 74.5 square mile (190.4 km2) area. Additionally, the site provides information on a number of other subjects.

Gender
Five hundred seventy-five of the village's residents are male while only 565 are female. The median age of the male population is 43 years. The median age for females is 44.

Race
Out of Lower Salem's 1,140 full-time residents, 1,125 (98.7%) are White/Caucasian, 7 (.6%) are Black/African-American, 1 (.1%) is Native American Indian, another is Asian, another is Pacific Islander, still another is of another race, and 4 (.3
%) are of mixed race.

Household Information
Fifty-four percent of the town's 475 permanent residences are occupied by married couples (including couples without children), 29% housed single persons, 9% were single parent/guardian households, and the remaining 8% housed unwed individuals with a roommate. Only 134 of the 475 residences were occupied by residents with children. Of these households, the average family size was 4 persons. There were also 193 houses not occupied year-round. A majority of these are owned and/or used by non-resident hunters. Another large portion have been abandoned because of disrepair.

Employment and Income
Fifty-one percent of the population has no personal income earnings (this is likely due to a combination of three factors: 1. A large portion of residents are retirees, 2. Minors (whether of employable age or not) were included in the tabulations, and 3. Many married couples opt to have only one breadwinner). Another 37% of residents work full-time. The remaining individuals are employed on a part-time basis. The mean annual income is $45,417 and is down from a peak of $95,528 during the '2014 Oil and Gas Boom.' The vast majority of employed persons must travel between 20 and 39 minutes to work. This is approximately the time it takes most residents to drive from Lower Salem to the seat of Washington County Marietta.

2010 census
As of the census of 2010, there were 86 people, 31 households, and 21 families residing in the village. The racial makeup of the village was 93.0% White and 7.0% African American. Hispanic or Latino of any race were 1.2% of the population.

There were 31 households, of which 35.5% had children under the age of 18 living with them, 41.9% were married couples living together, 16.1% had a female householder with no husband present, 9.7% had a male householder with no wife present, and 32.3% were non-families. 19.4% of all households were made up of individuals, and 3.2% had someone living alone who was 65 years of age or older. The average household size was 2.77 and the average family size was 3.19.

The median age in the village was 41 years. 23.3% of residents were under the age of 18; 5.8% were between the ages of 18 and 24; 28% were from 25 to 44; 29.1% were from 45 to 64; and 14% were 65 years of age or older. The gender makeup of the village was 44.2% male and 55.8% female.

2000 census
As of the census of 2000, there were 109 people, 36 households, and 27 families residing in the village. The population density was 1,373.2 people per square mile (526.1/km2). There were 38 housing units at an average density of 478.7 per square mile (183.4/km2). The racial makeup of the village was 93.58% White, 0.92% African American, and 5.50% from two or more races.

There were 36 households, out of which 47.2% had children under the age of 18 living with them, 44.4% were married couples living together, 22.2% had a female householder with no husband present, and 25.0% were non-families. 19.4% of all households were made up of individuals, and 8.3% had someone living alone who was 65 years of age or older. The average household size was 3.03 and the average family size was 3.52.

In the village, the population was spread out, with 33.0% under the age of 18, 10.1% from 18 to 24, 31.2% from 25 to 44, 18.3% from 45 to 64, and 7.3% who were 65 years of age or older. The median age was 30 years. For every 100 females there were 73.0 males. For every 100 females age 18 and over, there were 73.8 males.

The median income for a household in the village was $36,875, and the median income for a family was $36,875. Males had a median income of $26,875 versus $16,875 for females. The per capita income for the village was $10,209. There were 7.4% of families and 5.0% of the population living below the poverty line, including 3.7% of under eighteens and 10.5% of those over 64.

References

Villages in Washington County, Ohio
Villages in Ohio